Smith & Thell are a pop/folk band based in Stockholm, Sweden. The duo, composed of Maria Smith (vocals, guitar) and Victor Thell (vocals, guitar, production), first met one another as young teenagers at a local music event in their hometown of Helsingborg in Southern Sweden.

Their debut album Soulprints was released in April 2017 via the Nordic indie label Playground Music.

The follow up international hit single, "Forgive Me Friend", came in November 2018, and led the band to signing its first major label deal with the storied American label, Arista Records, a subsidiary of Sony Music Entertainment. Smith & Thell's sophomore album, "Pixie's Parasol" came via Arista Recordings in 2021, and featured the hits "Forgive Me Friend", "Hotel Walls", "Year of the Young", and "Goliath". The duo went on to perform on stages across the world with other artists, including The Head and the Heart, Young the Giant, and Fitz and The Tantrums.

Smith & Thell have simultaneously established themselves as one of Sweden's most sought-after songwriters and producer duos. They won the 2020 Swedish Grammis award for Composer of the Year, and their writing credits for major label artists, including Jennifer Lopez, Ava Max, Martin Garrix, Rauw Alejandro, Gryffin, Alan Walker, Maejor, NOTD, and R3HAB, account for over 3 Billion global streams.

History 
In 2015, they released the song "Statue", which was performed on the SVT Moraeus in the same year. Also in 2015, the duo won the Denniz Pop Awards with Max Martin in the jury. In spring of 2016, they won Musexpo in Los Angeles in the category "New Emerging International Artist". The same year, influencer and music critic Bob Lefsetz placed "Statue" at number 16 on his list of the best songs of 2016 with the description, "An instant classic, you'll get this one immediately." The duo followed up "Statue" with the singles "Row" (2016), "February" (2017), and "Toast" (2017), before releasing their debut album Soulprints on May 12, 2017.

The band's first major breakthrough came in November 2018, with their hit single "Forgive Me Friend". The song has since been streamed over 85 million times and earned Platinum (3x) status in Sweden and Gold status in Norway. The hit reached #1 on Pop Radio in Sweden and Poland, Top 25 on U.S. Alternative Radio, and Top 10 on U.S. Triple A Radio. Smith & Thell’s follow-up 2019 single, "Hotel Walls", quickly shot to #1 on Swedish Pop Radio and has been streamed over 50 million times. It is certified Platinum in Sweden and Gold in Norway. In 2020, Smith & Thell won a Swedish Grammis for Composers of the Year, and in 2021, they won a Rockbjörnen for Best Group 2021.

Musical style 
Smith has stated, "We don't work towards making albums with one specific sound; it's song-by-song written on the way while we live...these last years have been a rollercoaster of emotions: we lost a loved family member way too young, we went from being a couple to continuing the band as friends, our career took off for real, we toured the world...to just name a few things. So the album was written on the way while all these things happened."

“We can't seem to get away from the sharp emotional turns in our music... [we] travel from the lowest pitch black bottom to the euphoric highs."

Discography

Albums

EPs 
 Statue (2016)
 Telephone Wires (2018)

Singles

Notes

Awards 
 2015 Denniz Pop Awards - "Rookie Artist of the Year"
 2016 Musexpo in Los Angeles - "New Emerging International Artist"
 2020 Swedish Grammis - Composers of the Year
 2021 Swedish Rockbjörnen - "Best Group 2021"

References

External links
Twitter
Facebook

Swedish folk music groups
Swedish pop music groups
2012 establishments in Sweden
Musical groups established in 2012